Pavlovskoye is a rural locality (a selo) in Ivanovskoye Rural Settlement, Kovrovsky District, Vladimir Oblast, Russia. The population was 447 as of 2010. There are 9 streets.

Geography 
Pavlovskoye is located 28 km southeast of Kovrov (the district's administrative centre) by road. Ivanovo is the nearest rural locality.

References 

Rural localities in Kovrovsky District